Comerica Park is a baseball stadium located in Downtown Detroit. It has been the home of Major League Baseball's Detroit Tigers since 2000, when the team left Tiger Stadium.

History

Construction

Founded in 1894, the Tigers had played at the corner of Michigan and Trumbull Avenues in Detroit's Corktown neighborhood since 1896, when Bennett Park opened. In 1911, new Tigers owner Frank Navin ordered the construction of a new ballpark to be built on the same site. Opening in 1912, the ballpark, which eventually became known as Tiger Stadium, served as the Tigers' home for the next 88 seasons. By the mid-1990s, it had become apparent that the much-beloved ballpark had become obsolete and could not be renovated any further.

Comerica Park sits on the original site of the Detroit College of Law. Groundbreaking for the new stadium was held on October 29, 1997. At the time of construction, the scoreboard in left field was the largest in Major League Baseball. It was part of a downtown revitalization plan for the city of Detroit, which included the construction of Ford Field, adjacent to the ballpark. The first game was held on April 11, 2000, against the Seattle Mariners.

First game
The first game at Comerica Park was held on Tuesday, April 11, 2000, with 39,168 spectators attending, on a cold snowy afternoon. The Tigers beat the Seattle Mariners 5–2. The winning pitcher, as in the final game at Tiger Stadium, was Brian Moehler.

Naming rights
In December 1998, Comerica Bank agreed to pay $66 million over 30 years for the naming rights for the new ballpark. In 2018, Comerica extended its naming rights agreement with the Tigers through 2034.

Features

The main entrance to the ballpark is located across the street from the Fox Theatre and between two historic downtown churches, St. John Episcopal Church and Central United Methodist Church. There are 8 other heroic-sized tiger statues throughout the park, including two prowling on top of the scoreboard in left field. These tigers' eyes light up after a Tigers home run or a victory and the sound of a growling tiger plays as well. The tigers were originally created by sculptor Michael Keropian and fabricated by ShowMotion Inc. in Norwalk, Connecticut. Along the brick walls outside the park are 33 tiger heads with lighted baseballs in their mouths.

At the left-center field concourse there are statues of almost all of the players whose numbers have been retired by the Tigers (with the exception of Jackie Robinson, whose number was retired in every MLB park in 1997 and is located on the wall in right-center field). A statue of Ty Cobb is also there, but he does not have a number, as he played baseball before players began to wear numbers on their uniforms. These players' names, along with the names of Hall of Fame players and broadcasters who spent a significant part of their career with the Tigers, are also on a wall in right-center field. Ernie Harwell, the team's long time radio announcer and a recipient of the Hall of Fame's Ford C. Frick Award, has a statue just inside the stadium on the first base side.

Comerica Park is currently the only ballpark in MLB to feature a distinctive dirt strip between home plate and the pitcher's mound. This strip, sometimes known as the "keyhole", was common in early ballparks, but it is very rare in modern facilities. Additionally, the home plate area is in the shape of the home plate itself, and not as a standard circle.

In the northeastern corner of the stadium behind the stands from the third base line is a Ferris wheel with twelve cars designed like baseballs. In the northwestern corner of the stadium behind the stands from the first base line is a carousel.

The flagpole located between center and left fields was originally in play, as was the flagpole in Tiger Stadium. However, the left field wall was moved in front of the pole before the 2003 season. A ball that hits the pole is now ruled a home run. The right field of the stadium features the Pepsi Porch, a picnic deck between the 100 and 200 level seating bowls. Also in right field, and part of the 100 level seating bowl, is an area of seats known as "Kaline's Corner", an homage to Hall of Fame right fielder Al Kaline, who once played for the Tigers when the team played in Tiger Stadium.

An LED scoreboard was added to the right-center field wall, and the upper deck fascia for the 2007 season.

A giant fountain is located behind center field. General Motors sponsored the fountain from 2000 to 2008, and used the area to showcase GM manufactured vehicles as well. While GM dropped its sponsorship for the 2009 season due to financial issues, the GM branding was not removed from the fountain. Instead, signs for Chrysler and Ford were also added to the display, along with the message "The Detroit Tigers support our automakers." In 2010, GM returned to sponsoring the display, now known as the Chevrolet Fountain.

A completely redesigned and upgraded left field video display debuted for the 2012 season. The serif "TIGERS" wordmark was removed and replaced by cursive lettering that can also display graphics and video. An analog clock below the Tigers wordmark and above the Comerica Park logo was also removed. An HD LED display was installed, which was much larger than the three displays that had been there for years. The previous scoreboard used light bulbs – still a popular scoreboard technology around the time the park opened, though they were quickly aging as LED displays became available and were installed around other Major League ballparks. The scoreboard was also raised  in an effort to address complaints that the scoreboard was too far left and thus obstructed by the left field upper deck. Along with the replacement scoreboard, all remaining bulb fascia scoreboards were also upgraded to LED.

In 2014, the Tigers announced a $4 million renovation to Comerica Park's Pepsi Porch. This renovation included the removal of the bleachers that once occupied the space and the addition of new stadium seats. The plan also included new high top tables, a new bar in the middle of the porch, couches and lounge chairs, as well as a fire pit. The bleachers that once occupied the area were moved to the space above The Jungle restaurant and bar.

There is a fireworks show after Friday evening games usually starting after Memorial Day.

Dimensions
In contrast to Tiger Stadium, which had long been considered one of the most hitter-friendly parks in baseball, Comerica Park is considered to be extremely friendly to pitchers. Except for dead center field, the outfield dimensions were more expansive than those at Tiger Stadium. This led to complaints from players and fans alike. Most famously, Bobby Higginson sarcastically referred to the venue as "Comerica National Park".

This also removed the flagpole from the field of play, originally incorporated as an homage to Tiger Stadium. Two years later, the bullpens were moved from right field to an empty area in left field created when the fence was moved in. In place of the old bullpens in right field, about 950 seats were added. This made one of the most pitcher-friendly ballparks transform into the third most batter-friendly (with extra bases also taken into account).

This was due to the actual distances from home plate being revealed via laser measurements. The club also announced that the center field, right-center field, and right field fences would be lowered to 7 feet. 

In the layout of the playing field at Comerica Park, when a player is at bat, the direction he is facing looks farther to the south than at any other ballpark.

Transportation
Public transportation for the park is available via the Detroit People Mover station at Grand Circus Park and the QLine at the Montcalm Street station, in addition to SMART, which runs regional routes from the suburbs, and DDOT.

Stadium use

Baseball
In 2005, Comerica Park hosted the 76th MLB All-Star Game, the first to be played in Detroit since 1971. In the Home Run Derby, held the day before, Bobby Abreu slammed 24 home runs in the first round, breaking the previous record of 15. Abreu won the Derby over Tiger Iván Rodríguez, hitting a then record 41 homers during the event. In the All-Star Game, the American League won 7–5 with Miguel Tejada winning the game's MVP Award.

The first playoff game at Comerica Park was played on October 6, 2006, against the New York Yankees. On October 21, 2006, Comerica Park hosted the first World Series game in the history of the ballpark (Game 1 of the 2006 World Series).

On June 12, 2007, the first no-hitter was thrown at Comerica Park by Justin Verlander. The Tigers won the game 4–0 against the Milwaukee Brewers. It was also the first no-hitter thrown by a Tiger in the city of Detroit since Virgil Trucks accomplished the feat in 1952.

In 2008, the Tiger statue at the main entrance of the ballpark was dressed with a Detroit Red Wings jersey as the Red Wings were playing against the Pittsburgh Penguins in the Stanley Cup Finals. The jersey is usually worn by the Spirit of Detroit, but it was undergoing restoration during that time.

On August 15, 2011, Minnesota Twins slugger Jim Thome became the eighth player in baseball history to hit 600 career home runs.

Comerica Park hosted its second World Series in 2012, with the Tigers getting swept by the San Francisco Giants.

On April 23, 2022, Tigers slugger Miguel Cabrera became the 33rd player in Major League history to get his 3,000th hit with a single in the first inning off of Colorado Rockies pitcher Antonio Senzatela.

Concerts

Hockeytown Winter Festival

On February 9, 2012, NHL commissioner Gary Bettman announced that Comerica Park would host the Hockeytown Winter Festival in concert with the 2013 NHL Winter Classic held at Michigan Stadium. The festival was to include events such as games between teams in the Ontario Hockey League, the American Hockey League, the Great Lakes Invitational, youth hockey games, and the NHL alumni game. Due to the 2012–13 NHL lockout, the festival was cancelled. The festival was rescheduled for December 2013. An outdoor rink was set up on the infield of the ballpark for public skating and hockey games.

Soccer
On July 19, 2017, Comerica Park hosted its first ever soccer game between Roma of the Italian Serie A League against Paris Saint-Germain of France's Ligue 1 in the 2017 International Champions Cup tournament.

See also

Tourism in metropolitan Detroit
Heather Nabozny

References

Further reading

External links

 Stadium site on MLB.com
 Video review of Comerica Park with on-site footage
 Comerica Park Tiger Sculptures

2000 establishments in Michigan
Baseball venues in Michigan
Detroit Tigers stadiums
Downtown Detroit
Major League Baseball venues
Olympia Entertainment
Ice hockey venues in Detroit
Outdoor ice hockey venues in the United States
Sports venues completed in 2000
Sports venues in Detroit
Populous (company) buildings